Ari Mustonen is a Finnish cross-country skier. He represented Finland at the 1984 Winter Paralympics held in Innsbruck, Austria. He won the bronze medal at the men's short distance 5 km LW2 event.

References 

Living people
Year of birth missing (living people)
Place of birth missing (living people)
Paralympic cross-country skiers of Finland
Finnish male cross-country skiers
Cross-country skiers at the 1984 Winter Paralympics
Medalists at the 1984 Winter Paralympics
Paralympic bronze medalists for Finland
Paralympic medalists in cross-country skiing
20th-century Finnish people